I'm Through with White Girls (The Inevitable Undoing of Jay Brooks) is a 2007 independent romantic comedy film starring Anthony Montgomery and directed by Jennifer Sharp. The film was shot in Los Angeles over the course of twenty-four days.

Plot 
Jay Brooks (Montgomery), a black man, vows to give up dating white women in favor of dating black women, only to fall in love with a biracial woman.

Cast

 Anthony Montgomery as Jay Brooks
 Ryan Alosio as Matt McKenzie
 Lia Johnson as Catherine Williamson
 Lisa Brenner as Molly
 Johnny Brown as Sam Moore
 Jeff Wadlow as Billy
 Alaina Reed Hall as Jerri Hall
 Lamman Rucker as Drake Moore
 Kellee Stewart as J.C. Evans
 Lynn Chen as Candace

Awards

References

External links 
 
 

2007 romantic comedy films
2007 films
African-American films
African-American gender relations in popular culture
American romantic comedy films
Films shot in Los Angeles
2000s English-language films
American independent films
Films about interracial romance
2007 independent films
2000s American films